Overpainting is the final layers of paint, over some type of underpainting, in a system of working in layers. It can also refer to later paint added by restorers, or an artist or dealer wishing to "improve" or update an old image—a very common practice in the past.  The underpainting gives a context in which the paint-strokes of the overpainting become more resonant and powerful. When properly done, overpainting does not need to completely obscure the underpainting. It is precisely the interaction of the two that gives the most interesting effects.

Overpainting was used extensively in many schools of art. Some of the most spectacular results can be seen in the work of Jan van Eyck.

It can be difficult to distinguish overpainting from underpainting in finished historical artworks in the absence of scientific tests. X-rays are often used to examine paintings because they allow the conservation technician to see what is hidden beneath a surface without having to damage it, depending on the materials used.   By using different intensities of X-rays, experts can see different layers of paint and determine whether a canvas was ever painted over.

See also

References
Max Doerner
"Detecting Deception" in Detecting the Truth: Fakes, Forgeries and Trickery, a virtual museum exhibition at Library and Archives Canada 
 An example of overpainting in the contemporary still life painting of Hanneke van Oosterhout

External links 
Example of overpainting in still life

Conservation and restoration of paintings
Painting techniques